Maloye Baydavletovo (Kese Baydäwlät) is a rural locality (a village) in Tazlarovsky Selsoviet, Zianchurinsky District, Bashkortostan, Russia. The population was 15 as of 2010. There is 1 street.

Geography 
Maloye Baydavletovo is located 17 km southeast of Isyangulovo (the district's administrative centre) by road. Nizhny Sarabil is the nearest rural locality.

References 

Rural localities in Zianchurinsky District